or  is a traditional multi-course Japanese dinner. The term also refers to the collection of skills and techniques that allow the preparation of such meals and is analogous to Western haute cuisine.

The development of nouvelle cuisine was likely inspired by  principles.

Origin
The kanji characters used to write  literally mean "breast-pocket stone". The idea came from the practice where Zen monks would ward off hunger by putting warm stones into the front folds of their robes, near their stomachs.

Before these kanji started to be used, the kanji for writing the word were simply ones indicating that the cuisine was for a gathering.

All of these individual cuisines were formalized and developed over time, and continue in some form to the present day, but have also been incorporated into  cuisine. Different chefs weight these differently – court and samurai cuisine are more ornate, while temple and tea ceremony cuisine are more restrained.

Style

In the present day,  is a type of art form that balances the taste, texture, appearance, and colors of food. To this end, only fresh seasonal ingredients are used and are prepared in ways that aim to enhance their flavor. Local ingredients are often included as well. Finished dishes are carefully presented on plates that are chosen to enhance both the appearance and the seasonal theme of the meal. Dishes are beautifully arranged and garnished, often with real leaves and flowers, as well as edible garnishes designed to resemble natural plants and animals.

Order

Originally,  comprised a bowl of miso soup and three side dishes; this is now instead the standard form of Japanese-style cuisine generally, referred to as a セット (setto, "set").  has since evolved to include an appetizer, sashimi, a simmered dish, a grilled dish and a steamed course, in addition to other dishes at the discretion of the chef.
: an appetizer similar to the French amuse-bouche.
: the second course, which sets the seasonal theme. Typically one kind of sushi and several smaller side dishes. Traditionally served on a square dish measuring eight  on each side.
: a sliced dish of seasonal sashimi.
: vegetables served with meat, fish or tofu; the ingredients are simmered separately.
: a "lidded dish"; typically a soup.
: (1) flame-grilled food (esp. fish); (2) earthenware, pottery, china.
: a small dish used to cleanse the palate, such as vegetables in vinegar; vinegared appetizer.
: a soup, usually a clear broth with few accompaniments.
: served only in summer; chilled, lightly cooked vegetables.
: another palate-cleanser; may be a light, acidic soup.
: a substantial dish, such as a hot pot.
: a rice dish made with seasonal ingredients.
: seasonal pickled vegetables.
: a miso-based or vegetable soup served with rice.
: a seasonal dessert; may be fruit, confection, ice cream, or cake.

Cha-kaiseki

This is the meal served in the context of chanoyu (Japanese tea ceremony). It precedes the serving of the tea at a formal tea function (chaji). The basic constituents of a cha-kaiseki meal are the ichijū sansai or "one soup, three side dishes", and the rice, plus the following: suimono, hassun, yutō, and kōnomono. The one soup referred to here is usually suimono (clear soup) or miso soup and the basic three side dishes are the following:
Mukōzuke: foods in a dish arranged on the far side of the meal tray for each guest, which is why it is called mukōzuke (lit., "set to the far side"). Often this might be some kind of sashimi, though not necessarily so. On the near side of the meal tray are arranged the rice and the soup, both in lacquered lidded bowls.
: simmered foods, served in individual lidded bowls.
Yakimono: grilled foods (usually some kind of fish), brought out in a serving dish for the guests to serve themselves.
Here under is a description of the additional items mentioned above:
: clear soup served in a small lacquered and lidded bowl, to cleanse the palate before the exchange of sake (rice wine) between host and guests. Also referred to as kozuimono (small clear soup) or hashiarai (chopstick rinser).
Hassun: a tray of tidbits from mountain and sea that the guests serve themselves to and accompanies the round of saké (rice wine) shared by host and guests.
: pitcher of hot water having slightly browned rice in it, which the guests serve to themselves.
Kō no mono: pickles that accompany the yutō.
Extra items that may be added to the menu are generally referred to as shiizakana and these attend further rounds of sake. Because the host leaves them with the first guest, they are also referred to as azukebachi (lit., "bowl left in another's care").

Casual kaiseki

Casual  meals theatrically arrange ingredients in dishes and combine rough textured pottery with fine patterned bowls or plates for effect. The bento box is another casual, common form of popular .

locations 
Kyoto is well known for its , as it was the home of the imperial court and nobility for over a millennium.

Price
 is often very expensive –  dinners at top traditional restaurants generally cost from 5,000 yen to upwards of 40,000 per person, without drinks. Cheaper options are available, notably lunch (from around 4,000 to 8,000 yen (US$37 to $74), and in some circumstances bento (around 2,000 to 4,000 yen (US$18 to $37)). In some cases counter seating is cheaper than private rooms. At ryokan, the meals may be included in the price of the room or optional, and may be available only to guests, or served to the general public (some ryokan are now primarily restaurants). Traditional menu options offer three price levels, Sho Chiku Bai (traditional trio of pine, bamboo, and plum), with pine being most expensive, plum least expensive; this is still found at some restaurants.

See also 

 Shōjin-ryōri
 Honzen-ryōri

References

Further reading
 Murata, Yoshihiro. Kaiseki: The Exquisite Cuisine of Kyoto's Kikunoi Restaurant. New York: Kodansha International, 2006. IBN 4770030223.
 Tsuji, Kaichi. Kaiseki: Zen Tastes in Japanese Cooking. Kodansha International, 1972; second printing, 1981.
 Tsutsui, Hiroichi. "From kaiseki 会席 to kaiseki 懐石: The Development of Formal Tea Cuisine". Chanoyu Quarterly no. 50 (Urasenke Foundation, 1987).

External links

 
 
 Images of Kaiseki on Flickr
 Kyoto Travel Guide—Lists of Kyo Kaiseki Restaurants in Kyoto

Kaiseki ryori
Courses (food)
Dinner
Japanese cuisine terms